Udorn Pimpak (Thai อุดร พิมพ์ภาค), born February 7, 1982) is a Thai former footballer.

Honours

 Thailand Premier League 2007 Winner with Chonburi FC

References

1982 births
Living people
Udorn Pimpak
Udorn Pimpak
Association football defenders
Udorn Pimpak